Bunjikat (formerly: Yangiqurghon,) is a jamoat in north-west Tajikistan. It is in Shahriston District in Sughd Region. The jamoat has a total population of 15,344 (2015). It consists of 7 villages, including Guliston (the seat), Obodi and Sebzor.

The archaeological site of Bunjikat is the location of the former capital of the Principality of Ushrusana.

References

Populated places in Sughd Region
Jamoats of Tajikistan